This is a list of events in British radio during 1974.

Events

January
No events.

February
19 February – BRMB begins broadcasting to the Birmingham area.

March
17 March – Solid Gold Sixty is broadcast on BBC Radio 1 for the final time. It is replaced the following week by a one-hour programme which just features the top 20.

April
1 April – BBC Radio Teesside is renamed BBC Radio Cleveland.
2 April – Piccadilly Radio begins broadcasting to the Manchester area.

May
No events.

June
No events.

July
15 July – Metro Radio begins broadcasting to the Newcastle upon Tyne area.

August
No events.

September
Paul Gambaccini first broadcasts on British radio, initially on BBC Radio 1.
30 September – Swansea Sound, the first Independent Local Radio station in Wales, begins broadcasting to the Swansea area.

October
1 October – Radio Hallam begins broadcasting to the Sheffield area.
21 October – Radio City begins broadcasting to the Liverpool area.

November
22 November – The first regular programme in the UK for the black community, Black Londoners, launches on BBC Radio London, presented by Alex Pascall. The programme is initially launched as a trial run of six programmes before becoming a weekly, and from 1978, a weeknight, fixture in the schedules.

December
No events.

Unknown
BBC Radio Leicester launches a weekly programme for the Asian community.

Station debuts

19 February – BRMB
2 April – Piccadilly Radio
15 July – Metro Radio
30 September – Swansea Sound
1 October – Radio Hallam
21 October – Radio City

Programme debuts

20 April – The Betty Witherspoon Show on BBC Radio 2 (1974)
22 November – Black Londoners on BBC Radio London (1974–1988)

Continuing radio programmes

1940s
 Sunday Half Hour (1940–2018)
 Desert Island Discs (1942–Present)
 Down Your Way (1946–1992)
 Letter from America (1946–2004)
 Woman's Hour (1946–Present)
 A Book at Bedtime (1949–Present)

1950s
 The Archers (1950–Present)
 The Today Programme (1957–Present)
 The Navy Lark (1959–1977)
 Sing Something Simple (1959–2001)
 Your Hundred Best Tunes (1959–2007)

1960s
 Farming Today (1960–Present)
 In Touch (1961–Present)
 The Men from the Ministry (1962–1977)
 Petticoat Line (1965–1979)
 The World at One (1965–Present)
 The Official Chart (1967–Present)
 Just a Minute (1967–Present)
 The Living World (1968–Present)
 The Organist Entertains (1969–2018)

1970s
 PM (1970–Present)
 Start the Week (1970–Present)
 Week Ending (1970–1998)
 You and Yours (1970–Present)
 I'm Sorry I Haven't a Clue (1972–Present)
 Good Morning Scotland (1973–Present)
 Hello Cheeky (1973–1979)
 Kaleidoscope (1973–1998)
 Newsbeat (1973–Present)

Births
 15 January – Edith Bowman, music critic, radio disc jockey and television presenter
 22 February – Chris Moyles, disc jockey
 28 March – Scott Mills, disc jockey
 24 April
 Jon Holmes, writer, comedian and broadcaster
 David Vitty (Comedy Dave), radio presenter
 26 April – Adil Ray, broadcaster and comic actor
 28 April – Vernon Kay, broadcast presenter
 21 June – Natasha Desborough, radio presenter
 24 June – Rob da Bank, disc jockey
 2 July – Dan Tetsell, comedy writer-performer
 14 July – David Mitchell, comedy writer-performer
 24 July – Lisa Francesca Nand, journalist and broadcaster
 2 August – Phil Williams, radio news presenter
 6 October – Andy Zaltzman, satirical and cricket broadcaster
 24 November – Stephen Merchant, comedy writer-performer and radio presenter
 13 December – Sara Cox, disc jockey
 Ros Atkins, broadcast journalist
 Natalie Haynes, broadcaster, classicist, comedian and writer

Deaths
 4 May – Ludwig Koch, German-born British natural sound recordist (born 1881)

See also 
 1974 in British music
 1974 in British television
 1974 in the United Kingdom
 List of British films of 1974

References

Radio
British Radio, 1974 In
Years in British radio